Fabricio Raúl Jesús Oberto (born March 21, 1975) is an Argentine-Italian color analyst and former professional basketball player. At , he played as a center and power forward. With the LNB club Atenas, in his native Argentina, Oberto began playing professionally in 1993, and later played overseas with teams in Spain and Greece. In 2005, Oberto signed with the San Antonio Spurs, a team of the American National Basketball Association (NBA), and won a championship with the Spurs in 2007. He is also a former member of the senior Argentina national basketball team.

He was inducted into the FIBA Hall of Fame in 2019.

Professional career

Argentina and Europe
At age 17, Oberto went to a trial at Atenas de Córdoba, one of the most important basketball clubs in Argentina, and was selected to start the following year, and started playing professionally later that year. In 1998, after being chosen MVP of the finals of the Argentine league, he transferred to the Greek League club Olympiacos, starting his EuroLeague experience that would take him to the Spanish League's TAU Cerámica a year later. After 3 seasons with TAU, he moved to Pamesa Valencia in 2002.

NBA career
In 2005, after voiding his contract with Pamesa, Oberto signed a three-year, US$7.5 million contract with the San Antonio Spurs of the NBA, where he joined fellow Argentine Manu Ginóbili. He kept with jersey number 7, the same kit number he used with the Argentina national basketball team. Oberto was the oldest rookie in Spurs history at the age of 31.

During the first year of his NBA stint, Oberto was no longer the key player he had been in Europe, playing less than nine minutes per game on average. He nonetheless was very satisfied with his role on the Spurs, a perennial championship contender.

In his second NBA season, Oberto became more of a factor in the Spurs rotation, starting in some games and getting his first double-double on November 8, 2006, when he scored 22 points and pulled down 10 rebounds. He also became a pivotal player for the Spurs during the 2006–07 Western Conference Finals, averaging 31 minutes and 14 points in the first two games of the series. Oberto won an NBA championship with the Spurs in 2007.

On June 23, 2009, Oberto was traded to the Detroit Pistons as a part of a three-team trade among Pistons, Spurs and the Milwaukee Bucks, which included Richard Jefferson. Then he was immediately waived by the Pistons.

On August 11, 2009, he was signed by the Wizards. Since jersey number 7 was already taken by Andray Blatche, he chose to wear number 21 because of his birth date (March 21) and in honor of one of his idols, former teammate Tim Duncan. After a single season in which he got limited playing time as the team struggled through the Gilbert Arenas gun incident and ultimately began to rebuild, he became a free agent once more in the summer of 2010.

Oberto was a significant contributor defending Argentina for its fifth-place finish at the 2010 FIBA World Championship. After his solid play during the World Championship in Turkey, he received multiple offers from European teams, most notably Efes Pilsen and Real Madrid. Oberto held out for an opportunity to sign with an NBA team. He reached an agreement to join the Portland Trail Blazers for the 2010–11 season. However, on November 4, 2010, after playing five games for Portland, he began experiencing palpitations related to a previous heart condition and decided to retire in order to preserve his health.

Return to activity
In January 2013, Oberto signed a contract with his former team, Atenas de Córdoba, returning to the Liga Nacional de Básquetbol after 14 years. Oberto was hired for the remainder of the season as a replacement for center Julián Aprea, who had been separated from the team by coach Alejandro Lotterio and then dismissed at the end of 2012.

National team career
Oberto started playing with the Argentina national basketball team shortly before his 20th birthday in 1995; tournament success followed, including bringing to Argentina a gold medal at the 2004 Summer Olympics.

In July 2011, Oberto announced that he was coming out of retirement to play in the FIBA Americas Championship. He said that doctors had cleared him to participate. Personal problems prevented him from playing for Argentina in the 2012 Summer Olympics.

Accomplishments and awards

Clubs
 Argentine Youth League Champion: 1993
 South American Club Championship champion: 1994
 Pan American Club Championship champion: 1996
 FIBA South American League champion: 1997, 1998
 Argentine League champion: 1998
 Spanish King's Cup winner: 2002
 Spanish League champion: 2002
 ULEB Cup champion: 2003
 NBA champion: 2007

Argentina national team
 Summer Olympics : 2004
 Summer Olympics : 2008
 Pan American Games : 1995
 FIBA World Championship : 2002
 FIBA Americas Championship : 2001, 2011
 FIBA Americas Championship : 1995, 2003
 FIBA South American Championship : 1997
 FIBA Diamond Ball : 2008
 FIBA Diamond Ball : 2004

Post-playing career
On February 9, 2021, the Austin Spurs of the NBA G League announced that Oberto would be the team's color analyst during the 2020–21 season.

Personal life
Oberto was born in Las Varillas, Argentina. Oberto and his wife have a daughter. He also enjoys playing the guitar and his favorite bands include Pearl Jam, Nirvana, Foo Fighters, U2 and Metallica.

On June 4, 2009, Oberto underwent a successful ablation procedure to correct the electrical system of the heart that was sending Oberto into atrial fibrillation. The procedure was performed at the Texas Cardiac Arrhythmia Institute in Austin.

NBA career statistics

Regular season

|-
| style="text-align:left;"|
| style="text-align:left;"|San Antonio
| 59 || 0 || 8.3 || .473 || .000 || .556 || 2.1 || .5 || .2 || .2 || 1.7
|-
| style="text-align:left; background:#afe6ba;"|
| style="text-align:left;"|San Antonio
| 79 || 33 || 17.3 || .562 ||  || .647 || 4.7 || .9 || .3 || .3 || 4.4
|-
| style="text-align:left;"|
| style="text-align:left;"|San Antonio
| 82 || 64 || 20.1 || .608 || .000 || .607 || 5.2 || 1.2 || .5 || .2 || 4.8
|-
| style="text-align:left;"|
| style="text-align:left;"|San Antonio
| 54 || 11 || 12.5 || .587 || .000 || .571 || 2.6 || 1.1 || .1 || .2 || 2.6
|-
| style="text-align:left;"|
| style="text-align:left;"|Washington
| 57 || 20 || 11.4 || .625 ||  || .765 || 1.8 || .9 || .2 || .2 || 1.5
|-
| style="text-align:left;"|
| style="text-align:left;"|Portland
| 5 || 0 || 9.0 || .600 ||  || .500 || 1.4 || .0 || .0 || .0 || 1.4
|- class="sortbottom"
| style="text-align:center;" colspan="2"|Career
| 336 || 128 || 14.5 || .576 || .000 || .617 || 3.5 || .9 || .3 || .2 || 3.2

Playoffs

|-
| style="text-align:left;"|2006
| style="text-align:left;"|San Antonio
| 7 || 0 || 4.9 || .333 ||  || .250 || .9 || .1 || .1 || .4 || 1.0
|-
| style="text-align:left; background:#afe6ba;"|2007
| style="text-align:left;"|San Antonio
| 20 || 12 || 20.8 || .625 || .000 || .571 || 4.9 || .7 || .3 || .2 || 5.6
|-
| style="text-align:left;"|2008
| style="text-align:left;"|San Antonio
| 17 || 9 || 19.5 || .609 ||  || .700 || 4.2 || 1.2 || .4 || .3 || 3.7
|-
| style="text-align:left;"|2009
| style="text-align:left;"|San Antonio
| 2 || 0 || 11.0 || .667 ||  || 1.000 || 2.0 || .0 || 1.0 || .0 || 6.0
|- class="sortbottom"
| style="text-align:center;" colspan="2"|Career
| 46 || 21 || 17.4 || .603 || .000 || .615 || 3.9 || .8 || .3 || .3 || 4.2

References

External links

 EuroLeague profile
 Liga ACB profile 
 FIBA profile

1975 births
Living people
1998 FIBA World Championship players
2002 FIBA World Championship players
2006 FIBA World Championship players
2010 FIBA World Championship players
Argentine expatriate basketball people in Spain
Argentine expatriate basketball people in the United States
Argentine expatriate sportspeople in Greece
Argentine men's basketball players
Argentine people of Italian descent
Atenas basketball players
Basketball players at the 1995 Pan American Games
Basketball players at the 1996 Summer Olympics
Basketball players at the 2004 Summer Olympics
Basketball players at the 2008 Summer Olympics
Centers (basketball)
FIBA Hall of Fame inductees
Greek Basket League players
Italian men's basketball players
Liga ACB players
Medalists at the 1995 Pan American Games
Medalists at the 2004 Summer Olympics
Medalists at the 2008 Summer Olympics
National Basketball Association players from Argentina
Olympiacos B.C. players
Olympic basketball players of Argentina
Olympic bronze medalists for Argentina
Olympic gold medalists for Argentina
Olympic medalists in basketball
Pan American Games gold medalists for Argentina
Pan American Games medalists in basketball
Portland Trail Blazers players
Power forwards (basketball)
San Antonio Spurs players
Saski Baskonia players
Sportspeople from Córdoba Province, Argentina
Undrafted National Basketball Association players
Valencia Basket players
Washington Wizards players